Sokolohirne is village in Henichesk Raion (district) in Kherson Oblast of southern Ukraine, at about  east by south (EbS) of the centre of Kherson city. It belongs Henichesk urban hromada, one of the hromadas of Ukraine.

The village was captured by Russian forces in 2022, during the Russian invasion of Ukraine.

References

Villages in Henichesk Raion